HCE may refer to:
 HCE (car), a British cyclecar
 Humboldt Current ecosystem
 Choriolysin H, an enzyme
 Harvey Comics Entertainment
 Hawaii Creole English language
 Hexachloroethane 
 Hierarchical Cluster Engine Project
 Host card emulation
 RNGTT, a protein
 Humphrey Chimpden Earwicker, a character in James Joyce's novel Finnegans Wake
 Halo: Combat Evolved